Austin Cooper may refer to:
 Austin Cooper, a car of the Mini series
 Austin Cooper (artist) (1890–1964), Canadian-British illustrator and commercial artist
 Austin Cooper (lawyer) (1930–2013), Canadian criminal lawyer